Cephetola mariae is a butterfly in the family Lycaenidae. It is found in Cameroon, the Central African Republic, Uganda, Kenya and Tanzania.

References

Butterflies described in 1999
Poritiinae